Two Sides Of is the second studio album released by Irish singer Daniel O'Donnell in 1985. It was with the release of this album that O'Donnell rose to prominence in Ireland, and led the way for him to be recognised in the UK. The song My Donegal Shore, was O'Donnell's first hit and is seen today as the song that kick-started his career in the Irish music scene.

Track list

 Green Glens of Antrim – 2:52
 Blues Hills of Breffni – 3:40
 Any Tipperary Town – 3:17
 The Latchyco – 2:20
 Hometown on the Foyle – 2:56
 These Are My Mountains – 3:21
 My Donegal Shore – 3:28
 Crying My Heart Out Over You – 3:04
 My Old Pal – 3:01
 Our House is a Home – 2:10
 Your Old Love Letters – 3:30
 21 Years – 3:11
 Highway 40 Blues - 2:41
 I Wouldn't Change You If I Could - 3:10

References

External links
 Daniel O'Donnell's website

1985 albums
Daniel O'Donnell albums